The 2005 Segunda División B play-offs (Playoffs de Ascenso or Promoción de Ascenso) were the final playoffs for promotion from 2004–05 Segunda División B to the 2005–06 Segunda División. The four first placed teams in each of the four Segunda División B groups played the Playoffs de Ascenso and the four last placed teams in Segunda División were relegated to Segunda División B.

Teams for 2004/2005 play-off
RSD Alcalá
SD Ponferradina
AD Ceuta
Hércules CF
Sevilla B
Zamora CF
CD Castellón
Universidad de Las Palmas CF
Alicante CF
Rayo Vallecano
Real Zaragoza B
Lorca Deportiva CF
Real Unión
Burgos CF
UB Conquense
Real Madrid B

Eliminatories

First round

Second round
 Group A--Second Eliminatory
Home Match

Away Match

Promoted to Segunda División: Hércules CF

Group B--Second Eliminatory
Home Match

Away Match

Promoted to Segunda División: CD Castellón

Group C--Second Eliminatory
Home Match

Away Match

Promoted to Segunda División: Lorca Deportiva CF

Group D--Second Eliminatory
Home Match

Away Match

Promoted to Segunda División: Real Madrid B 

Segunda División B play-offs
1
play